Casco Histórico de Vicálvaro is a ward (barrio) of Madrid belonging to the district of Vicálvaro.

Wards of Madrid
Vicálvaro